Agustín de Rojas Villandrando (August 1572 – c. 1618) was a Spanish writer and actor.

Early years 
Rojas Villandrando was born in Madrid. He served as a soldier in France and was a prisoner in La Rochelle. He was persecuted in Italy for killing a man in Malaga and he took refuge in the temple of San Juan. He bought his freedom with three hundred ducats. He then lived in a number of cities in Spain including Sevilla and Granada.

Work 
He was known for his loas. His work El buen republico was banned by the Inquisition because it dealt with astrology and the author was suspected of being Jewish.

Death 
Rojas Villandrando died in Paredes de Nava sometimes before 1635 since his wife, Ana de Arceo whom he married in 1603, was already called a widow in 1635. His last known correspondence was in 1618.

Works 
 El viaje entretenido ("The Pleasant Voyage")

External links 
 Biography

References

1572 births
1610s deaths
Writers from Madrid
Spanish male writers
Male actors from Madrid
17th-century Spanish actors
17th-century Spanish writers
Baroque writers